The men's 1500 metres in speed skating at the 1998 Winter Olympics took place on 12 February, at the M-Wave arena.

Records
Prior to this competition, the existing world and Olympic records were as follows:

Due to the use of clap skates in comparison to the previous Olympics the Olympic record got broken considerably and the following new world and olympic records were set during the competition.

Results

References

Men's speed skating at the 1998 Winter Olympics